This is a list of people who have served as custos rotulorum of Essex.

 Sir William Petre bef. 1544–1572
 Sir Anthony Cooke c. 1573–1576
 Sir Thomas Mildmay c. 1577–1608
 Thomas Howard, 1st Earl of Suffolk bef. 1621–1624
 Theophilus Howard, 2nd Earl of Suffolk 1624–1640
 William Maynard, 1st Baron Maynard 1640
 Robert Rich, 2nd Earl of Warwick 1640–1642
 James Hay, 2nd Earl of Carlisle 1642–1646, 1660
 Charles Rich, 4th Earl of Warwick 1660–1673
 William Maynard, 2nd Baron Maynard 1673–1688
 Thomas Petre, 6th Baron Petre 1688
For later custodes rotulorum, see Lord Lieutenant of Essex.

References
Institute of Historical Research - Custodes Rotulorum 1544-1646
Institute of Historical Research - Custodes Rotulorum 1660-1828

Essex